Laibach is the debut album of the Yugoslavian (now Slovenia) industrial group Laibach. It was first released on LP in 1985, and reissued on CD in 1991 with two extra tracks composed by Laibach's sub-group 300.000 V.K. Another CD reissue in 1999 featured further bonus material.

Track listing

References

1985 debut albums
Laibach (band) albums